Tom Guinn (born 1 September 1944) is a Canadian sports shooter. He competed at the 1976 Summer Olympics (Canada) and the 1984 Summer Olympics (USA).

References

External links
 

1944 births
Living people
Canadian male sport shooters
Olympic shooters of Canada
Shooters at the 1976 Summer Olympics
Shooters at the 1984 Summer Olympics
Sportspeople from St. Catharines
Commonwealth Games medallists in shooting
Commonwealth Games gold medallists for Canada
Commonwealth Games silver medallists for Canada
Commonwealth Games bronze medallists for Canada
Pan American Games medalists in shooting
Pan American Games gold medalists for Canada
Pan American Games silver medalists for Canada
Pan American Games bronze medalists for Canada
Shooters at the 1975 Pan American Games
Shooters at the 1979 Pan American Games
Shooters at the 1982 Commonwealth Games
Shooters at the 1986 Commonwealth Games
20th-century Canadian people
21st-century Canadian people
Medallists at the 1982 Commonwealth Games
Medallists at the 1986 Commonwealth Games